Muirton railway station, also known as Muirton Halt railway station, served the suburb of Muirton, Perth and Kinross, Scotland, from 1936 to 1959.

History 
The station opened on 31 October 1936 by the London Midland and Scottish Railway. It primarily served St Johnstone FC's football ground, Muirton Park. It was only used on match days and it closed on 21 November 1959.

References

External links 

Disused railway stations in Perth and Kinross
Former London, Midland and Scottish Railway stations
Railway stations in Great Britain opened in 1936
Railway stations in Great Britain closed in 1959
1936 establishments in Scotland
1959 disestablishments in Scotland
Railway stations in Perth, Scotland